A jestrum piercing, also known as a vertical medusa, is an upper lip piercing that is very similar to a labret piercing, or more specifically a vertical labret piercing. It is placed in the philtrum of the upper lip, directly under the nasal septum. Unlike the similar medusa piercing, a jestrum piercing uses a curved bar-bell, and both ends of the piercing are visible externally with the lower part of the bar-bell curving around the underside of the upper lip. Sometimes it is combined with a lower labret piercing to form a symmetrical look.

Incorrect jewelry and improper placement can lead to gum and tooth erosion, and other problems associated with oral piercings.

References

External links
Encyclopedia entry on the jestrum: Body Modification E-Zine

Facial piercings